Chris Jongewaard (born ) is an Australian former professional racing cyclist. For the mountain bike event at the 2008 Summer Olympics, Jongewaard lost his legal appeal to be included in the team after being excluded because of a car accident, involving another cyclist for which he was due to face court in late 2008. He represented his nation in the men's elite event at the 2016 UCI Cyclo-cross World Championships in Heusden-Zolder.

Major results

Cyclo-cross

2014–2015
 1st  National Championships
2015–2016
 2nd National Championships
2016–2017
 1st  National Championships
 Qiansen Trophy
2nd Fengtai Station
3rd Yanqing Station
2017–2018
 1st  National Championships
 1st Rapha Supercross Nobeyama #2
 National Series
1st Round 5
2nd Round 6
 2nd Rapha Supercross Nobeyama #1
 2nd Utsunomiya
2018–2019
 1st  National Championships
 3rd Utsunomiya Day 2
 National Series
3rd Round 8
3rd Round 9
2019–2020
 1st  National Championships
 1st Melbourne Grand Prix #1
 1st Melbourne Grand Prix #2

Road

2005
 1st Stage 1 (TTT) Herald Sun Tour
2006
 2nd Overall Herald Sun Tour
 2nd 
 9th Overall Tour Down Under
2008
 1st Stage 4 Herald Sun Tour
 2nd 
2009
 1st  Time trial, Oceania Road Championships
 5th Time trial, National Road Championships

MTB

2004
 2nd National XCO Championships
2005
 1st  Oceania XCO Championships
 1st  National XCO Championships
2006
 2nd National XCO Championships
 3rd  Oceania XCO Championships
2007
 1st  Oceania XCO Championships
 1st  National XCO Championships
2008
 1st  Oceania XCO Championships
 1st  National XCO Championships
2009
 1st  National XCO Championships
2011
 1st  Oceania XCO Championships
 1st  National XCO Championships
2013
 1st  National XCO Championships

References

External links
 

1979 births
Living people
Cyclo-cross cyclists
Australian male cyclists
Australian mountain bikers
Cyclists from Adelaide
Cyclists at the 2006 Commonwealth Games
Commonwealth Games competitors for Australia
Cape Epic cyclists
20th-century Australian people
21st-century Australian people